"Hang On to Your Love" is a song by English band Sade from their debut studio album, Diamond Life (1984). It was released in November 1984 as the album's first North American single and fourth single overall.

Reception
Frank Guan of Vulture commented that "Sade's first introduction to an American audience came with this song: powered by a heavy, driving bassline and some of Sade's best advice-centered lyrics, 'Hang On' ensured that her stateside fans would do just that."

Track listings
German and Dutch 7-inch single
A. "Hang On to Your Love" (Radio Edit) – 3:58
B. "Should I Love You" – 3:50

Dutch 7-inch maxi single (US Remix)
A. "Hang On to Your Love" (US Remix) – 5:13
B1. "Should I Love You" – 3:50
B1. "Why Can't We Live Together" – 5:28

US and Canadian 7-inch single
A. "Hang On to Your Love" – 4:21
B. "Cherry Pie" – 4:25

US 12-inch single
A. "Hang On to Your Love" (Album Version) – 5:54
B. "Hang On to Your Love" (7″ Version) – 4:21

Charts

Weekly charts

Year-end charts

References

1984 singles
1984 songs
Epic Records singles
Sade (band) songs
Songs written by Sade (singer)
Songs written by Stuart Matthewman